Sir Kenneth Allen Stevens  (born ) is a New Zealand businessman. He founded baggage handling technology company Glidepath in 1972.

In the 2008 New Year Honours, Stevens was appointed a Distinguished Companion of the New Zealand Order of Merit, for services to exporting. In 2009, following the restoration of titular honours by the New Zealand government, he accepted redesignation as a Knight Companion of the New Zealand Order of Merit. In 2012, he was inducted as a "flying Kiwi" into the HiTech hall of fame. Stevens was inducted into the New Zealand Business Hall of Fame in 2020.

References

1940s births
Year of birth missing (living people)
Living people
Knights Companion of the New Zealand Order of Merit
New Zealand businesspeople
Businesspeople awarded knighthoods